Tansu Çiller (born 24 May 1946) is a Turkish academic, economist, and politician who served as the 22nd Prime Minister of Turkey from 1993 to 1996. She was and will always be Turkey's first and only female prime minister. As the leader of the True Path Party, she went on to concurrently serve as Deputy Prime Minister of Turkey and as Minister of Foreign Affairs between 1996 and 1997.

As a Professor of Economics, Çiller was appointed Minister of State for the economy by Prime Minister Süleyman Demirel in 1991. When Demirel was elected as President in 1993, Çiller was elected leader of the True Path Party and succeeded Demirel as Prime Minister.

Her premiership preceded over the intensifying armed conflict between the Turkish Armed Forces and the PKK, resulting in Çiller's enacting numerous reforms to national defense and implementing the Castle Plan. With a better equipped military, Çiller's government was able to persuade the United States and the European Union to register the PKK as a terrorist organization. However, Çiller was responsible for war crimes and crimes against humanity perpetrated against the Kurdish people by the Turkish military, security forces, and paramilitary. Several reports of international organizations of human rights documented destroying and burning Kurdish villages and towns and extrajudicial killings of Kurdish civilians perpetrated by the Turkish military during Çiller’s government of 1993-1996.

Shortly after winning the 1994 local elections, large-scale capital flight due to the lack of confidence in Çiller's budget deficit targets led to the Turkish lira and foreign currency reserves' almost collapsing. Amid the subsequent economic crisis and austerity measures, her government signed the EU-Turkey Customs Union in 1995. Her government was alleged to have supported the 1995 Azeri coup d'état attempt and presided over an escalation of tensions with Greece after claiming sovereignty over the Imia/Kardak islets.

Although the DYP came third in the 1995 general election, she remained as Prime Minister until she formed a coalition government with Necmettin Erbakan in 1996. That year's Susurluk car crash and subsequent scandal revealed the relations between extra-legal organisations and Çiller's government. Revelations that she had employed individuals connected with the Turkish mafia such as Abdullah Çatlı led to a decline in her approval ratings. Erbakan's and Çiller's coalition government fell due to a coup by military memorandum, following which the DYP declined further in the 1999 general election. Despite coming third in the 2002 general election, Çiller's DYP won less than 10% of the vote and thus lost all parliamentary representation, which led to her resignation as party leader and departure from active politics.

Background and academic career 
Tansu was born in Istanbul; she was the only child of her father Necati Çiller, a journalist and governor of Bilecik Province during the 1950s, and Muazzez Çiller, a Rumelian Turk from Thessaloniki.

Tansu Çiller graduated from the department of Economics at Boğaziçi University after completing her high school education at Robert College in Istanbul. After graduating from Boğaziçi, she continued her studies in the United States, where she earned graduate degrees from the University of New Hampshire and University of Connecticut with her husband Özer Uçuran, who she married in 1963. She later completed her postdoctoral studies at Yale University.

Çiller taught economics at Franklin and Marshall College in Lancaster, Pennsylvania. In 1978, she became a lecturer at Boğaziçi University in Istanbul and in 1983 she was appointed as professor by the same institution. She was also president of the now-defunct Istanbul Bank.

Early political career 
In addition to her job at Boğaziçi, Çiller made a name for herself with her studies at TÜSİAD and her critical reports of the Motherland Party's (ANAP) economic policies. For a short time she was a consultant to Bedrettin Dalan, then Mayor of Istanbul. In December of the same year, she was elected to the administrative board of the other major center-right party, the True Path Party (DYP) and became the deputy president responsible for the economy. Çiller entered parliament as a deputy from Istanbul in the 1991 election. Çiller took credit for some DYP slogans for the election, such as "Two keys", but also generated controversy with the economic program called UDİDEM, which was not implemented by the government. DYP won the election, and formed a coalition government with the Social Democrat Populist Party (SHP). Çiller was appointed as a minister of state responsible for the economy by Prime Minister Süleyman Demirel. She was elected to the executive board of DYP and acquired the position of deputy chair.

After the death in office of President Turgut Özal (which according to some was part of an alleged military coup), Prime Minister Demirel won the 1993 presidential election. Suddenly the important position as Prime Minister and leader of the DYP was vacant. The party found itself in a leadership crisis. Çiller was no obvious candidate, but her three challengers could not muster the political capital to compete effectively. The media and business community supported her, and her gender gave the impression that Turkey was a progressive Muslim country. She fell 11 votes shy of a majority in the first ballot for party leader. Her opponents withdrew and Çiller became the party's leader and on 25 June, the first and so far only female Prime Minister of Turkey. She continued the DYP-SHP coalition with small changes (50th government of Turkey).

As prime minister 

While forming her coalition an Islamist mob set fire to a hotel which was hosting an Alevi cultural event, killing 35. The Sivas massacre and the government's slow response foreshadowed Çiller's future handling of human rights.

Çiller chose to continue Demirel's coalition government with the SHP, but replaced most of the ministers from her own party. She was the only woman in cabinet until 1995, when a woman state minister for women and family affairs was appointed. As Prime Minister Çiller promoted a pro-military conservative populism and economic liberalism. She shifted the DYP more to the right compared to her mentor Demirel. She juggled "masculine" and "feminine" styles, boasting of her "toughness" at the same time as she wanted to be the nation's mother and sister. She became a new role model for women politicians, though was accused of being authoritarian. Çiller appeared uninterested in women's issues.

Fighting the PKK 

The Sivas and Başbağlar massacres occurred days after the beginning of her premiership. The Castle Plan (previously approved by the National Security Council) was implemented to combat the Kurdistan Workers' Party (PKK) (although elements of the strategy preceded the official plan). The Çiller government was heavily criticized for committing human rights violations during counter-terrorism operations. Çiller transformed the Turkish Army from an organization using vintage equipment from the US Army into a modern fighting force capable of countering the PKK, using hit-and-run tactics. She also convinced the U.S. government to list the PKK as a Foreign Terrorist Organization, which was later followed by the acceptance of the same by the European Union. Her overall approach to the Kurds was ambiguous, while she suggested for the Kurds an autonomy similar the one the Basques have in Spain, she retracted her statement upon pressure from the Turkish military.

Links with organized crime 

She declared in October 1993: "We know the list of businessmen and artists subjected to racketeering by the PKK and we shall be bringing their members to account." Beginning on 14 January 1994, almost a hundred people were kidnapped by commandos wearing uniforms and traveling in police vehicles and then killed somewhere along the road from Ankara to Istanbul. Abdullah Catli, a leader of the ultra-nationalist Grey Wolves and an organized crime figure, demanded money from people who were on "Çiller’s list", promising to get their names removed. One of his victims, Behçet Cantürk, was to pay ten million dollars, to which Casino King Ömer Lütfü Topal added a further seventeen million. However, after receiving the money, he then went on to have them kidnapped and killed, and sometimes tortured beforehand.

Corruption 
Following the collapse of her government, allegations of corruption were filed against Çiller, included among the many charges was that she interfered in the privatization of the state run corporations Tofaş and Tedaş by demanding that she should read the sealed bids that prospective companies put forward. These bids were later given back to the privatization board and were found to be opened, presumably allowing Çiller the opportunity to financially benefit from the privatization. In addition she allegedly used discretionary funds allocated to the prime ministry for her personal benefit, and refused to reveal to President Demirel or to future Prime Minister Mesut Yılmaz what they were used for, using the excuse of "national security."

Her popularity also suffered when Milliyet ran an exposé of her undeclared properties in the United States. A motion to investigate Çiller's assets was rejected in the parliament. She announced that she would donate her property to the Martyr Zübeyde Hanım Mother's Foundation before the 1995 election, but never followed through with this.

Foreign Policy 

The EU-Turkey Customs Union agreement was signed in 1995 and came into effect in 1996 during Çiller's government.

In March 1995, the 1995 Azeri coup d'état attempt took place; official reports following the 1996 Susurluk scandal suggested Çiller and others in cabinet had supported the coup attempt, which aimed to reinstall Ebulfeyz Elçibey as president.

Çiller was prime minister during the January 1996 Imia/Kardak crisis with neighbouring Greece. As deputy Prime Minister under Erbakan's premisership, Çiller declared that if Greece tried to divide Albania, it would have the Turkish Army in Athens 24 hours later.

She was the first Turkish Prime Minister to visit Israel as well as meet with Yaser Arafat.

1995 election and Ana-Yol government 
After the withdrawal of the Republican People's Party (CHP) from the coalition in October 1995 (the SHP had split, merged, and renamed itself) Çiller attempted to form a minority government with confidence and supply from the Nationalist Movement Party (MHP), which failed in less than a month (51st government of Turkey). She agreed to form another cabinet (52nd government of Turkey) with the CHP in the lead up to 1995 general election. Çiller employed nationalist and secularist rhetoric in the party's first election with her as party chair. DYP received a resounding defeat, losing 30% of its support from 1991.

Coalition negotiations were protracted, and Çiller remained in office at the head of the DYP-CHP coalition until March 1996, when the DYP formed an unstable coalition with ANAP and the Democratic Left Party (DSP) supplying confidence, with Mesut Yılmaz becoming Prime Minister, and herself Alternate Prime Minister. Necmettin Erbakan filed suit in the Constitutional Court when the government succeeded in a vote of confidence with only a plurality, not a majority –Bülent Ecevit's DSP voted to abstain in the end. Çiller found herself boxed in from two directions: the Grand National Assembly voted to investigate allegations of corruption against her in a vote in which opposition parties –even her coalition partners– supported, and the Constitutional Court ruled that the government's vote of confidence was unconstitutional. Prime Minister Yılmaz resigned 6 June, ending the ANAYOL government.

Refah-Yol government and MGK memorandum 

After the Motherland–DYP coalition collapsed in June 1996, the DYP formed a historic coalition with the Welfare Party (RP), under Necmettin Erbakan, with Çiller as Minister of Foreign Affairs, Deputy Prime Minister, and Alternate Prime Minister. This coalition was controversial, not only did an openly Islamist politician become premier for the first time in the history of the Turkish Republic, but Çiller lost credibility for joining forces with those she most criticized on the campaign trail. Whatever Çiller and Erbakan said of each other in the past was history, both were isolated and needed each other to survive. Çiller needed a coalition partner to keep a parliamentary majority from lifting her and her allies' immunities to investigate her corruption charges, while Erbakan needed the same so as to fight his ideological struggle against the secularist Turkish military.

In an eight (Welfare and DYP members) to seven vote, the Parliamentary Investigation Commission decided that her misuse of public funds on Tofaş and Tedaş tenders had no need to be reviewed by the Constitutional Court. The coalition with Welfare has been interpreted as a quid pro quo for Çiller's acquittal. She was reelected chairwoman of DYP in a party congress, but Hüsamettin Çindoruk resigned with several DYP deputies to form the Democrat Turkey Party (DTP).

Susurluk 
After the November 1996 Susurluk car crash, which resulted in a scandal that demonstrated the close ties that the government, security services, organized crime, and far-right groups had with each other, she praised Abdullah Çatlı, who died in the crash, saying: "Those who fire bullets or suffer their wounds in the name of this country, this nation, and this state will always be respectfully remembered by us." The Citizens' Initiative for Eternal Light lead a series of protests against the government for its links with organized crime groups. Interior Minister Mehmet Ağar resigned following the scandal, and was replaced by Meral Akşener.

1997 "post-modern" coup 
The Turkish Armed Forces eyed the coalition with great suspicion, but Çiller hoped that her secular credentials and strong relationship with the military could ease tensions. She positioned herself as an intermediate between the secularist military and the Islamist Welfare Party. However by the beginning of 1997, relations between the government and the military were increasingly strained, especially after a Welfare mayor of Sincan hosted the Iranian Ambassador who gave a speech in support of Sharia Law (See Jerusalem Meeting). The military subsequently displayed a show of strength by driving a tank convoy through Sincan a few days later.

After a nine hour National Security Council meeting held on February 28, 1997, a set of demands were presented to the Refah-Yol government to combat what the military called İrtica (reactionarism). Çiller's relationship with the military completely broke down. She saw that the military was determined to overthrow the government, and recommended retiring the chief of staff and force commanders, but this which was blocked by a calmer Erbakan. Çiller and Akşener were successful in sacking the Chief of National Police and getting his replacement to wiretap high ranking generals of the Turkish Armed Forces. Upon one general learning of that he was being wiretaped by the Interior Ministry he allegedly threatened to “impale her [Akşener] like a goose.”

With resignations of DYP ministers from the government and pressure from the military, Erbakan resigned, and the "post-modern coup" concluded on 30 June, 1997. DYP and others expected to form a government under Çiller, but President Demirel disregarded the rotation agreement and asked ANAP leader Yılmaz to form the new government instead. While Erbakan's fall from power condemned his political career until the end of his life, Çiller's was also effectively over. Her maneuvers, political excuses, failed policies, and scandals made her very unpopular. Almost one-third of her party didn't join vote in voting with her against the confidence vote of Yılmaz's new government. 35 women's organizations took her to court because she lacked feminist principles. She was also criticized for undermining democracy and threatening journalists.

Fall from politics 
Tansu Çiller was investigated by the Turkish Parliament on serious corruption charges and abuses of power following her period in government. Along with Mesut Yılmaz, she was later cleared of all charges mainly due to technicalities such as statute of limitations and parliamentary immunity. Near the end of 1998, the corruption files about Yılmaz and Çiller were covered up at the commissions of the Parliament in a common action staged by DYP, ANAP and DSP MPs. In the 1999 general election she presented herself as a leader of the downtrodden and the religious, pausing her campaign speeches during the prayer of Adhan, or demanding that women with their headscarves on should attend university. Her party polled at only about 12%. She was still reelected DYP's chairwoman in a party conference later that year, and became Leader of the Main Opposition with the closure of Erbakan's Virtue Party and the split in the Milli Görüş movement.

Çiller's political career came to its end when her party narrowly failed to poll above the 10% threshold in the 2002 general election, thus receiving no representation in parliament despite her role as Leader of Main Opposition for more than two years. In a press conference she announced her retirement from politics, and was succeeded by Mehmet Ağar.

Later career 

She is a member of the Council of Women World Leaders, an international network of current and former women presidents and prime ministers whose mission is to mobilize the highest-level women leaders globally for collective action on issues of critical importance to women and equitable development.

Çiller attended a Justice and Development Party rally in 2018 in support of Recep Tayyip Erdoğan's candidacy for that years presidential election.

Personal life 
Tansu Çiller can speak English and German well, and has two children with her husband, Özer Uçuran Çiller.

See also 
 Türkan Akyol
 Women in Turkish politics
 Female political leaders in Islam and in Muslim-majority countries

References

External links 

 Biyografi.net - Biography of Tansu Çiller
 Who is Who - Biographies : Prof. Dr. Tansu Çiller

|-

|-

|-

1946 births
Living people
20th-century prime ministers of Turkey
20th-century women rulers
21st-century Turkish women politicians
21st-century Turkish politicians
20th-century women scientists
Prime Ministers of Turkey
Ministers of State of Turkey
Ministers of Foreign Affairs of Turkey
Deputy Prime Ministers of Turkey
Leaders of the Opposition (Turkey)
Democrat Party (Turkey, current) politicians
Members of the 21st Parliament of Turkey
Members of the 20th Parliament of Turkey
Members of the 49th government of Turkey
Members of the 50th government of Turkey
Members of the 51st government of Turkey
Members of the 52nd government of Turkey
Members of the 54th government of Turkey
Deputies of Istanbul
Politicians from Istanbul
Susurluk scandal
Turkish women economists
Turkish non-fiction writers
Boğaziçi University alumni
Academic staff of Boğaziçi University
Franklin & Marshall College faculty
Alumni of Arnavutköy American High School for Girls
University of Connecticut alumni
Women prime ministers
Female foreign ministers
Women government ministers of Turkey
Female party leaders of Turkey
Turkish women academics
Centre-right politics in Turkey
Robert College alumni
Women Prime Ministers of Turkey